Lake City is an unincorporated community in Barber County, Kansas, United States. As of the 2020 census, the population of the community and nearby areas was 47.

History
Lake City was named for Riley Lake, who opened a store there in 1878.

A post office was opened in Lake City in 1873, and remained in operation until it was discontinued in 1993.

Demographics

For statistical purposes, the United States Census Bureau has defined this community as a census-designated place (CDP).

References

Further reading

External links
 Barber County maps: Current, Historic, KDOT

Unincorporated communities in Barber County, Kansas
Unincorporated communities in Kansas